Shunzo Kido (城戸 俊三, July 4, 1889 – October 3, 1986) was a Japanese equestrian who competed in eventing at the 1928 and 1932 Summer Olympics. In 1932, while leading the tournament with one jump left, he felt that his horse became lame and dismounted to save her from potential injury, abandoning his chances for a medal.

References

External links
 

1889 births
1986 deaths
Olympic equestrians of Japan
Equestrians  at the 1928 Summer Olympics
Equestrians  at the 1932 Summer Olympics